Xenomigia crenula is a moth of the family Notodontidae. It is found in north-eastern Ecuador.

The length of the forewings is 15.5-17.5 mm. The ground colour of the forewings is dark brown with orange-yellow veins. The hindwings are translucent, light grey-brown, with a faint, narrow grey-brown postmedial band.

Etymology
The species name is derived from Latin crenula (meaning a notch) and refers to the emarginate ventral margin of the male valva base.

References

Moths described in 2011
Notodontidae of South America